The 1974–75 New Mexico Lobos women's basketball team represented the University of New Mexico in the 1974-75 AIAW women's basketball season. In their inaugural season, the Lobos were coached by Kathy Marpe, who also coached the women's volleyball, and started the women's track and field teams. They played in the Intermountain Conference.

Roster

Schedule and Results

References

New Mexico Lobos women's basketball seasons